Gabriela Cuevas Barron (born April 3, 1979) is a Mexican politician. She is the current President of the Inter-Parliamentary Union and a current senator for Mexico.

Personal life and education
Cuevas, at the age of 15, became interested in public service as a result of undertaking scholarly Catholic missionary work in and around Mexico. After getting, by her own free self, a keen eye for what she strongly felt as corruption in and out of rural and urban Mexican towns that she visited doing her school missionary work; Being just 15 years, she decided to start and continue to devote and focus her life on the merely social aspect of such a Catholic missionary work; this, by becoming active in Mexican politics as well as in, as she grew up, in several NGOs.

Since being just a 15-year-old girl from the city, her inner focus and determination to serve others has propelled her to a career as a public servant of the highest standards and commitments, and in 2017, not just within the ins and outs of her country, but by managing to get the election and seal of approval of an unprecedented continental scale.

Cuevas Barron majored in political science at the Autonomous Technical Institute of Mexico (ITAM).

She is a second cousin to the wives of Alfredo del Mazo Maza, governor of the State of Mexico, and José Antonio Meade, the Institutional Revolutionary Party's 2018 presidential candidate for Mexico.

Political career

Cuevas has been an active and politically involved person and PAN member since 1994. She has occupied different positions inside her political party including head of the PAN in Mexico city's Miguel Hidalgo area.

From 2000 to 2003 she served as federal deputy during the LVIII Legislature; then from 2003 to 2006 she served in the Legislative Assembly of the Federal District representing the PAN.

In April 2005, she and another PAN deputy, Jorge Lara, paid 2,000 MXN in order to prevent Andrés Manuel López Obrador from being jailed as he would "become a martyr" had he gone to jail during his "desafuero".

In 2006 she was elected to serve as Jefe Delegacional of Miguel Hidalgo.

In 2009 she was elected as federal deputy at the LXI Legislature of the Mexican Congress.

In 2012 she was elected as senator at the LXII Legislature of the Mexican Congress.

On 18 October 2017, Cuevas Barron was elected as the President of the Inter-Parliamentary Union, the first female from the Americas, after formally contending with Uruguayan politician, Ivonne Passada.

In January 2018, Cuevas Barron left the National Action Party to join the left-wing National Regeneration Movement (MORENA) citing that the objectives of inclusion, pluralism and development were not met. She will pose as an independent for the rest of her term as a senator, until the inauguration of the LXIV Legislature of the Mexican Congress, where she will represent MORENA. The PAN claimed she left the party since she was not guaranteed a federal deputy spot through the proportional representation process.

Since 2022, Cuevas Barron has been a member of the Commission for Universal Health convened by Chatham House and co-chaired by Helen Clark and Jakaya Kikwete.

Other activities 
 World Academy of Art and Science, Fellow

Notes

External links
 Gabriela Cuevas Barron public servant to Mexico official website
 Personal blog of Gabriela Cuevas

References

1979 births
Instituto Tecnológico Autónomo de México alumni
Living people
National Action Party (Mexico) politicians
Members of the Chamber of Deputies (Mexico)
Politicians from Mexico City
Women members of the Chamber of Deputies (Mexico)
Members of the Congress of Mexico City
21st-century Mexican politicians
21st-century Mexican women politicians
Members of the Constituent Assembly of Mexico City
Morena (political party) politicians
Deputies of the LVIII Legislature of Mexico
Deputies of the LXI Legislature of Mexico
Members of the Senate of the Republic (Mexico)
Women members of the Senate of the Republic (Mexico)